Keula Nidreia Pereira Semedo (born 25 July 1989) is a Cape Verdean Paralympic athlete. She made her maiden Paralympic appearance representing Cape Verde at the 2020 Summer Paralympics.

Biography 
She had relocated from Cape Verde to Portugal in 2010s following her mother's footsteps who also moved to Europe in order to be closer with her spouse.

Career 
She competed in both women's T11 100m T11 and women's 200m T11 events during the 2020 Summer Paralympics. She finished at fourth position in both women's 100m T11 category and women's 200m T11 category heat events and narrowly missed out on qualifying to the next round in both events.

During the women's 200m T11 category which was held on 2 September 2021, her guide Manuel Antonio Vaz da Lega dropped to the knee in front of Pereira Semedo and conveyed his love proposal to her.

References 

1989 births
Living people
Paralympic athletes of Cape Verde
Athletes (track and field) at the 2020 Summer Paralympics
Cape Verdean female sprinters
Cape Verdean expatriates in Portugal
Cape Verdean expatriate sportspeople in Portugal
Sportspeople from Praia